National Highway 333B, commonly referred to as Munger Ganga Bridge Road is a national highway in  India. It is a spur road of National Highway 33. NH-333B traverses the state of Bihar in India.

Route 
Munger - Khagaria/Begusarai , Munger Rail cum Road Bridge

Munger Ganga Bridge 

This short national highway connects these two cities via 3.692 km long  Munger Ganga Bridge road bridge across river Ganga.

Junctions  

  Terminal in Munger.
  Terminal near Khagaria.

See also 

 List of National Highways in India by highway number
 List of National Highways in India by state

References

External links 

 NH 333B on OpenStreetMap

National highways in India
National Highways in Bihar
Transport in Bhagalpur